The following is a list of presidential visits by the president of the United States to North Dakota, listed by president and sorted by whether or not the president was in office during the visit.

Visits while in office 
Thirteen presidents have visited the state during their time in office, either officially or unofficially.

Rutherford B. Hayes 
Rutherford B. Hayes was the first president to visit what is now North Dakota. He came to Fargo during September 1878 for a breakfast and a speech as part of his train tour of the west. Hayes also owned a  farm five miles (8 km) north of Bismarck in what is now the Hay Creek Township from 1877 to 1885. The land was given to him by Northern Pacific Railroad, although he never visited it. It sold in 1885 for $21,000.

Chester A. Arthur 
The next incumbent president to visit the state was Chester A. Arthur, who came in 1883 when his train passed through the state on his way to Yellowstone National Park. He was scheduled to attend a laying of the cornerstone for the new capitol of Dakota Territory, a ceremony also attended by former President Ulysses S. Grant, but was too tired so he ordered his train to take him back east.

Theodore Roosevelt 
Theodore Roosevelt visited the state while President in April 1903 during a tour of the west. He entered at Ellendale and went through Edgeley, North Dakota and on through Fargo. He then headed west through Jamestown, Bismarck, and Dickinson, and ended up in Medora.

Woodrow Wilson 
On September 10, 1919, Woodrow Wilson came to Bismarck while on a national speaking tour to get support for the League of Nations. He was driven through town in a motorcade, also spoke at an auditorium.

Franklin D. Roosevelt 
Franklin D. Roosevelt visited the state at least four times during his tenure as President. The first, in 1934, was to Devils Lake, North Dakota to view the extensive drought there; 35,000 people were present during his four-hour stay. He came to Bismarck in 1936 to view the drought's impact in that area and to hear from farmers who were seeking drought aid. In 1937, Roosevelt came to Grand Forks to dedicate a new fairgrounds grandstand, and he also made several unpublicized visits between 1942 and 1944 to tour military establishments.

Harry Truman 
Harry Truman came through the state in May 1950 as part of a whistle stop tour across the country. He visited Williston, Minot, New Rockford, and Fargo. He returned in 1952 on another whistle stop tour campaigning for Adlai Stevenson. This trip brought him all across the state.

Dwight D. Eisenhower 
In June 1953, Dwight D. Eisenhower came to the dedication ceremony of the Garrison Dam; his plane landed at the Minot airport. After he spoke there, he was driven to Bismarck where he went on a motorcade throughout the city before he flew out of Bismarck Municipal Airport. He also visited Minot in 1960.

John F. Kennedy 
Ten years later, President John F. Kennedy embarked on a five-day conservation tour that brought him to 11 states in the west where he encouraged the conservation of the nation's natural resources. This tour brought the President to the University of North Dakota in Grand Forks on September 25, 1963; less than two months before the assassination. While there, he accepted an honorary law degree from the university, and gave a 22-minute speech that endorsed the Garrison Diversion water project.

Richard Nixon 
Richard Nixon visited the state in Fargo on July 24, 1970 to talk to Governors at a national conference there. He also campaigned the same year in Grand Forks for Republican congressman Thomas S. Kleppe, who was running for United States Senate.

Ronald Reagan 
Ronald Reagan came to the University of North Dakota in Grand Forks in October 1986 to campaign for the re-election of Senator Mark Andrews.

George H.W. Bush 
In 1989, to celebrate the state's centennial, President George H. W. Bush came to the North Dakota State Capitol grounds to plant an American Elm tree near the capitol steps.

Bill Clinton 
Bill Clinton came to Grand Forks in April 1997 in the wake of the 1997 Red River flood.

George W. Bush 
President George W. Bush made his first of two visits to the state in March 2001, just two months after his inauguration. The trip was part of his national speaking tour to promote his proposed tax cut program in Congress. He spoke at the Bison Sports Arena at the North Dakota State University in Fargo. President Bush returned to Fargo in 2005, this time to promote his proposed changes in the Social Security system; he spoke again at the Bison Sports Arena.

Barack Obama 
President Barack Obama visited the "Cannon Ball Flag Day Powwow" on Friday, June 13, 2014.

Donald Trump 
President Donald Trump made an appearance at the Mandan refinery for a tax return speech on September 5, 2017. He also visited the state several times during the 2018 midterm election campaign on behalf of Senate candidate Kevin Cramer.

Visits while not in office

Ulysses S. Grant 
Ulysses S. Grant came to Bismarck in 1883 to participate in the laying of the cornerstone for new newly-designed capital of Dakota Territory. Along with Grant was Sitting Bull, and several other dignitaries. 5,000 people were in the audience.

Theodore Roosevelt 
Besides his one visit while an incumbent president, Theodore Roosevelt made many trips to the state, more than any other president. His first was in 1880 when he came to go bird hunting near Fargo. After this, he returned many times; as a cowboy-rancher in the Badlands in the 1880s, and also as a vice presidential nominee in 1900. During the 1900 trip, he made stops in Dickinson, Steele, Jamestown, Valley City, and Fargo. He made his only trip as President in 1903, and after this trip he made four more before his death. He came to Fargo in September 1910 where 30,000 people heard him speak at the dedication for a new library at  Fargo College. In April 1911 he stopped on his way back from California by going through the badlands; he stopped at Beach, Medora, Belfield, and several other cities before he left. Roosevelt came again in September 1912 for two days when he was running for President on the Progressive Party or Bull Moose ticket. At a speech in Grand Forks in front of 2,000 people during the trip, he was interrupted by a baby that was crying. The mother became embarrassed and got up to leave, but Roosevelt stopped her and said "Don't take him away. That's a small Bull Moose you have there, and we need all of them we can get." After this speech, he attended the state's Bull Moose Convention in Fargo, and then stopped in Bismarck and New Salem before going to Miles City, Montana for more campaigning. After the visit, Roosevelt came very close to carrying North Dakota in the election, but was beaten by Woodrow Wilson by 3,700 votes. Roosevelt's last visit was in October 1918, three months before his death. He stopped in cities like Bismarck, Fargo, and Dickinson, promoting the war effort. He spoke at a Sunday morning breakfast in Bismarck to 2,000 people.

Others 
President-elect William McKinley reportedly spent the night of November 5, 1896, at the Sherbrook House in Sherbrooke, then the county seat of Steele County. This was after his election but prior to taking the oath of office in 1897.

Harry Truman revisited the state after his time as President was done before the midterm elections in 1958 to blast Republicans and the Eisenhower administration for its farm policies.

Before visiting the state in 1963, John F. Kennedy also came several times during the late 1950s and early 1960s when he was campaigning for President. He stopped at towns such as Jamestown and Dickinson.

President Richard Nixon visited the state many times before his two visits as President; he came during the 1950s and 1960s while he was Vice President.

Prior to becoming the winning presidential candidate for the 1980 election and before formally announcing any campaign organization, Ronald Reagan visited Bismarck on February 7, 1979 to speak at a Lincoln Day dinner held by the local Bismarck Republican Council, on what was referred to as a "non-quest" for delegates for the presidential nomination from his party.  Reagan stayed the night in Bismarck, and left the next day via private plane back to his California home.  Reagan would pay Bismarck a visit once again after winning the presidential candidacy, by making an appearance and presenting a speech on the platform at the North Dakota Republican Convention, held at the Bismarck Civic Center on April 17, 1980.

Lyndon Johnson and Jimmy Carter never came as President, but both visited the state campaigning for the job in 1960 and 1976 respectively.  Taft visited in 1920.

References 

Presidential visits
North Dakota